Viișoara is a village in Edineț District, Moldova.

References

Villages of Edineț District
Khotinsky Uyezd